Galeruca is a genus of leaf beetles in the subfamily Galerucinae. It is distributed in the Palaearctic and Nearctic realms. In Turkey, the genus is represented by 10 species.

Species
Galeruca contains the following species, divided into seven subgenera:

Subgenus Galeruca Geoffroy, 1762:
 Galeruca abbreviata (Joannis, 1865)
 Galeruca altissima Chen & Jiang, 1981
 Galeruca angelae Havelka, 1958
 Galeruca angulicollis Kocher, 1959
 Galeruca angusta (Küster, 1849)
 Galeruca armeniaca Weise, 1886
 Galeruca artemisiae (Rosenhauer, 1956)
 Galeruca baetica Weise, 1891
 Galeruca barbara (Erichson, 1841)
 Galeruca barovskyi Jacobson, 1925
 Galeruca browni Blake, 1945
 Galeruca circassica Reitter, 1889
 Galeruca comaica Cheng & Jiang, 1981
 Galeruca corsica (Joannis, 1865)
 Galeruca costatissima Blake, 1945
 Galeruca dahlii (Joannis, 1865)
 Galeruca daurica (Joannis, 1865)
 Galeruca extensa (Motschulsky, 1862)
 Galeruca externa Say, 1824
 Galeruca goudoti (Joannis, 1865)
 Galeruca heydeni Weise, 1887
 Galeruca hunyadensis Csiki, 1953
 Galeruca hyrcana Medvedev & Mirzoevna, 1969
 Galeruca ida Havelka, 1956
 Galeruca impressicollis Pic, 1934
 Galeruca improvisa Havelka, 1956
 Galeruca indica Baly, 1878
 Galeruca interrupta Illiger, 1802
 Galeruca jucunda (Falderman, 1837)
 Galeruca laticollis Sahlberg, 1838
 Galeruca littoralis (Fabricius, 1787)
 Galeruca luctuosa (Joannis, 1865)
 Galeruca macchoi (Joannis, 1865)
 Galeruca nebrodensis Ragusa, 1887
 Galeruca nigrolineata Mannerheim, 1825
 Galeruca obscura (Joannis, 1865)
 Galeruca pallasia Jacobson, 1925
 Galeruca parallelipennis Beenen, 2002
 Galeruca planiuscula Laboissière, 1937
 Galeruca pomonae (Scopoli, 1763)
 Galeruca popenoei Blake, 1945
 Galeruca regularis Beenen & Yang, 2007
 Galeruca reichardti Jacobson, 1925
 Galeruca reichei (Joannis, 1865)
 Galeruca rudis J. L. LeConte, 1857
 Galeruca rugosa (Joannis, 1865)
 Galeruca sardosa (Gené, 1839)
 Galeruca sicana (Reiche, 1860)
 Galeruca sinensis Laboissière, 1937
 Galeruca spectabilis (Faldermann, 1837)
 Galeruca tanaceti (Linnaeus, 1758)
 Galeruca tripoliana (Chevrolat, 1873)
 Galeruca trubetzkoji Jacobson, 1925
Subgenus Emarhopa Weise, 1886
 Galeruca maculaticeps Pic, 1920
 Galeruca rufa Germar, 1824
Subgenus Fassatia Havelka, 1954
 Galeruca microptera Havelka, 1954
Subgenus Galerima Reitter, 1903
 Galeruca canigoensis Fauvel, 1892
 Galeruca miegii (Perez Arcas, 1874)
 Galeruca monticola (Kiesenwetter, 1850)
 Galeruca villiersi Berty & Rapilly, 1983
Subgenus Galerotoma Reitter, 1903
 Galeruca haagi (Joannis, 1865)
Subgenus Haptoscelis Weise, 1886
 Galeruca melanocephala (Ponza, 1805)
 Galeruca reitteri Havelka, 1958
Subgenus Rhabdotilla Jacobson, 1911 (formerly Galemira Beenen, 2003)
 Galeruca gyangzea Chen & Jiang, 1987
 Galeruca himalayensis Jacoby, 1896
 Galeruca holzschuhi (Mandl, 1981)
 Galeruca sexcostata Jacoby, 1904
 Galeruca zangana Chen & Jiang, 1987

References

Chrysomelidae genera
Galerucinae
Taxa named by Étienne Louis Geoffroy